Reinhard Krull (born 2 October 1954) is a former field hockey player from West Germany, who was a member of the West German team that won the silver medal at the 1984 Summer Olympics in Los Angeles, California.

References
 sports-reference

External links
 

1954 births
Living people
German male field hockey players
Olympic field hockey players of West Germany
Olympic silver medalists for West Germany
Field hockey players at the 1984 Summer Olympics
Olympic medalists in field hockey
Medalists at the 1984 Summer Olympics
20th-century German people